Initial D is a 2005 Hong Kong action film directed by Andrew Lau and Alan Mak. It is a film adaptation of the Japanese Initial D manga series, with elements combined from the first, second, and third stages. The main character, Takumi Fujiwara, is portrayed by Jay Chou in his film acting debut.

Plot
Takumi Fujiwara is a high school student who has been delivering tofu to the resorts in Mount Akina in his father Bunta's Toyota Sprinter Trueno AE86. He also works part-time at a gas station where his friend Itsuki, the owner's son and a high school dropout, aspires to be a street racer. Natsuki Mogi, an attractive classmate, smiles as she walks by Takumi, but she has been secretly going on dates with a sugar daddy who drives a Mercedes.

Street racers Takeshi Nakazato of the NightKids, who drives a Nissan Skyline GT-R, and Ryousuke Takahashi of the RedSuns, who drives a Mazda RX-7 (FC), talk about racing each other after they defeat the competition at Akina. When Takeshi visits the gas station to issue a challenge to the racing god of Mt. Akina, Itsuki (with Takumi riding along) arrives to defend that title, but in the ensuing race, Itsuki is embarrassed thoroughly and damages his Nissan Silvia. However, Takeshi is later beaten in an unofficial race by the AE86. Takeshi returns to the gas station to ask who owns the AE86. Yuichi asks Bunta if he has been racing again; he learns that Takumi has been driving the AE86 for the past five years and has been steadily improving his racing skills. Natsuki wants to go on a beach date with Takumi, so Bunta agrees to loan him the car and fill the gas tank provided that he wins the race at Akina.

Takumi defeats Takeshi in the downhill race in front of Ryousuke, Itsuki, and the other RedSuns and NightKids. Natsuki and Takumi enjoy a beach date. Takumi teaches Itsuki how to race a Trueno he has purchased. Halfway down the mountain, Seiji Iwaki of the Emperor Team in his Mitsubishi Lancer Evolution IV, taunts them and angers Takumi to the point that he races and defeats Seiji, causing the latter to spin out and damage the side of his Evo.

Takumi discovers that Itsuki's car does not perform like his father's car, which Ryousuke tells him it has been custom-tuned and modified. Takumi agrees to race Ryousuke in three weeks, but on the way downhill, Emperor team leader Kyouichi Sudo in his Lancer Evo III (E3) overtakes Takumi; in the ensuing race, the AE86's engine breaks down. Ryousuke tells Takumi that he will challenge Kyouichi, and offers to lend him one of his cars, but Takumi declines. Bunta tells Takumi that Natsuki is visiting her hometown for two weeks. Bunta and Yuuichi have the AE86 outfitted with a new  racing engine. Takumi struggles with the modified car well until Bunta shows him how to take advantage of its new mechanics.

After seeing Natsuki with the Mercedes guy coming from a love hotel, Itsuki tells Takumi that Natsuki is a prostitute, which angers Takumi and they fight. The afternoon before the race he thinks he sees Natsuki in the Mercedes at a railroad crossing but is unable to catch up to them. He later calls Natsuki, who tells him she is coming back tonight but is with the Mercedes guy whom she tells they cannot see each other anymore.

At the showdown, Ryousuke offers to team with Takumi on defeating Kyouichi, but Takumi declines. During the race, Ryousuke lets Kyouichi pass him and then follows closely. Ryousuke and Takumi use the gutter trick to overtake Kyouichi. Despite the warning messages of a driver going up the hill, Kyouichi's E3 tries to overtake the two but is forced to swerve off the road from the oncoming car and flips off the cliffside, totaling his Lancer Evo III. Ryousuke overtakes Takumi at the five hairpin turns. Bunta explains to the watchers that the FC's tires are losing their grip and that it is up to Takumi to compete against himself and not his opponent. Takumi undertakes Ryousuke on the last hairpin turn to win the race.

Ryousuke offers Takumi to join his new racing team, but Takumi goes to see Natsuki. However, he sees the Mercedes guy drop off Natsuki with a hug. Takumi and Natsuki see each other but Takumi runs away, while Natsuki falls to the ground crying. Takumi tearfully drives away. Takumi calls Itsuki to apologize and then calls Ryousuke to accept his offer to join Ryousuke's team (Project D).

Cast

Jay Chou as Takumi Fujiwara
Anne Suzuki as Natsuki Mogi, Takumi's classmate and love interest
Edison Chen as Ryousuke Takahashi, leader of the RedSuns
Anthony Wong as Bunta Fujiwara, Takumi's father, a former racer who now runs a tofu shop
Shawn Yue as Takeshi Nakazato, leader of the NightKids
Chapman To as Itsuki Takeuchi, Takumi's friend and the leader of the Akina SpeedStars. His father owns the gas station.
Jordan Chan as Kyouichi Sudou, leader of Team Emperor
Kenny Bee as Yuuichi Tachibana, the gas station owner and Bunta's friend

Tsuyoshi Abe as Kenji, one of the gas station attendants who is a member of Akina SpeedStars
Liu Keng Hung, as Seiji Iwaki, member of Team Emperor
Chie Tanaka as Miya, a female gas station attendant that Itsuki dates
Kazuyuki Tsumura as Mr. X, Natsuki's sugar daddy

Production

The Hong Kong, Taiwan, Japanese, American and British versions each have different soundtracks.

Release
Initial D was released on 23 June 2005 in several Asian markets including Hong Kong, Japan, Thailand, Singapore, South Korea, Taiwan and mainland China. In the Philippines, the film was released on 12 July 2006. In North America, the film screened at the Chicago International Film Festival on 15 October 2005 and had a limited run at the Imaginasian Theater in New York City on 30 December 2005.

Home media
Initial D was released as a direct to video DVD in Australia on 21 October 2005. It was released in the United Kingdom on 28 April, and the Philippines on 12 July 2006. Tai Seng Entertainment, the distributor of Initial D in the United States, released Initial D on Blu-ray on 22 January 2008. This is an exclusive release for the Blu-ray format which included an English dub.

Soundtrack
The Mink insert song "Beautiful" sold 2,786 units, grossing .

The U.K. release of the film features an entirely different soundtrack composed and compiled by Richie Warren of Fuel.

Critical reception
On review aggregator website Rotten Tomatoes, the film received an approval rating of 33% based on 6 reviews, with an average rating of 4.1/10.

Accolades
Initial D won six awards out of 15 nominations from the 42nd Golden Horse Awards in 2005 and 25th Hong Kong Film Awards in 2006.

42nd Golden Horse Awards

25th Hong Kong Film Awards

Cancelled Sequel
A sequel has been in discussion since the following year after the movie debuted. However, a concrete conclusion could not be reached due to obstacles that include the storyline, filming locations, casts, and safety reasons. In March 2014, director and producer, Andrew Lau, once again reconfirmed in an exclusive interview that a sequel will surely follow but is tight-lipped on the release date. Jay Chou and Edison Chen will reprise their roles. In 2018 Felix Chong, the screenwriter for the first film, stated he and Lau previously had plans to develop the sequel but both have since moved onto other projects, citing production costs being too high due to Lau's insistence on using real cars instead of CGI.  In 2020 director Andrew Lau stated that if a sequel is put into production he would likely not be directing it, citing the toll the first film took on his health, licensing issues, and once again budget issues, and also suggesting that Takumi should take on a mentor role similar to his father in the first film.  The sequel is now considered to be in Development hell.

Changes from the original manga and anime
The film differs from the manga and anime in several distinct ways. Because of this, the film mostly combines elements from First Stage, Second Stage, and briefly Third Stage as well.

Works cited

Initial D manga series 
 "Ch." and "Vol." are shortened forms for chapter and volume and refer to the appropriate sections in the Initial D manga:
Shigeno, Shuichi Initial D. (in Japanese) 45 vols. Tokyo: 1995–2012.
Shigeno, Shuichi Initial D. (English version) 33 vols. Los Angeles: Tokyopop. 2002–09

Initial D anime series 
 Entire series 
Initial D (in Japanese). 1998–2014
Initial D Tokyopop. 2003–05
Initial D Funimation. 2010–11

References

External links

Initial D
2005 films
2005 action thriller films
2000s Cantonese-language films
2000s road movies
Basic Pictures films
Chinese teen films
Films directed by Andrew Lau
Films directed by Alan Mak
Films set in Gunma Prefecture
Films shot in Japan
Hong Kong action thriller films
Hong Kong auto racing films
Japan in non-Japanese culture
Live-action films based on manga
Media Asia films
2000s Hong Kong films